Chitakatira High School is a co-educational school from form One to Sixth form located on the outskirts of Mutare, Zimbabwe about 23 kilometers from the City of Mutare. It is situated along the Burma Valley road. It was established in the early 1980s after the Zimbabwe Independence.

Notable alumni
famous Journalist in Moses Magadza.

References

High schools in Zimbabwe
Education in Manicaland Province
Educational institutions established in the 1980s
Mutare District
1980s establishments in Zimbabwe